The canton of Hirson is an administrative division in northern France. At the French canton reorganisation which came into effect in March 2015, the canton was expanded from 13 to 26 communes:
 
Any-Martin-Rieux
Aubenton
Beaumé
Besmont
Bucilly
Buire
Coingt
Effry
Éparcy
La Hérie
Hirson
Iviers
Jeantes
Landouzy-la-Ville
Leuze
Logny-lès-Aubenton
Martigny
Mondrepuis
Mont-Saint-Jean
Neuve-Maison
Ohis
Origny-en-Thiérache
Saint-Michel
Watigny
Wimy 
Saint-Clément

Demographics

See also
Cantons of the Aisne department 
Communes of France

References

Cantons of Aisne